Starting Out may refer to:
Starting Out, an Australian television soap opera made for the Nine Network by the Reg Grundy Organisation in 1983
Starting Out (British television series), seven series for schools made by ATV between 1973 and 1992
Starting Out, a British television series created by Maurice Gran and Laurence Marks in 1999 which ran for eight episodes
Starting Out, a song by The Screaming Jets from their album All for One (1991)